The Ontario Dental Association is a professional organization for dentists in the Canadian province of Ontario. It establishes a fee schedule and represents the interests of its members in dealing with the Ontario government and insurance companies.

A separate organization, the Royal College of Dental Surgeons of Ontario, regulates the dental profession in Ontario.

History 
It was founded by Dr. Barnabas Day in 1867.
The first woman member was Caroline Louise Josephine Wells, who joined in 1893.

References

External links

Dental organizations based in Canada
Professional associations based in Ontario
Organizations based in Toronto
Organizations established in 1867
1867 establishments in Ontario